Dame Agnes Gwendoline Hunt DBE RRC (31 December 1866 – 24 July 1948) was a British nurse, who is generally recognised as the first orthopaedic nurse.

Early life
She was born in London, daughter and sixth of eleven children of Rowland Hunt (1828-1878) of Boreatton Park, Baschurch, a village in west Shropshire, England, and his wife, Florence Marianne, eldest daughter of Richard Buckley Humfrey of Stoke Albany, Northamptonshire, England. She was a cousin of the Naval officer Sir Nicholas Hunt, his son being the politician Jeremy Hunt. Her own brother, another Rowland Hunt (1858-1943) was also a politician.

Hunt was brought up at Boreatton Park until 1882, then at Kibworth Hall, Leicestershire before her widowed mother took the children to Australia, where they lived on a small farmstead. She was disabled from osteomyelitis of the hip that she suffered from as a child following septicaemia.

Nursing career
In 1887, she returned to England and began training as a "lady pupil" nurse at the Royal Alexandra Hospital in Rhyl, Wales. She opened a convalescent home, the Baschurch Children's hospital, attached to the Salop Infirmary at Shrewsbury, for crippled children at Florence House (a family property) in Baschurch in 1900 which espoused the theory of open-air treatment.

In 1901, she sought treatment for her own condition from a Liverpool surgeon, Robert Jones.

She invited him to visit the convalescent home and he eventually began travelling there on a regular basis to provide treatment to the children. By 1907, they had built an operating theatre and they introduced the diagnostic use of X-rays in 1913. In 1910 it was approved as a training school by the Chartered Society of Massage and during World War I, Florence House was used to treat wounded soldiers.

In 1918, Hunt was awarded the Royal Red Cross for her contribution during the war.

Personal life
Agnes' companion over many decades was Emily Selina Goodford with whom she 'worked, quarrelled and loved...for thirty glorious years'. Agnes referred to Emily as 'Goody' and they lived together at Florence House, Baschurch. Goody died in 1920, after a short illness. In her autobiography Agnes wrote: 'Even now, after eighteen years, it is difficult to write of her and what she was to me....It is given to few people to live and work with one beloved friend for thirty years in perfect love and unity.'

Agnes and Emily share the same burial plot at All Saints Church, Baschurch.

Robert Jones and Agnes Hunt Orthopaedic Hospital
In 1919, the British Red Cross Society and the Shropshire War Memorial Fund provided financing to move the facility, renamed the Shropshire Orthopaedic Hospital, to a former military hospital at Park Hall, near Gobowen, Oswestry. The hospital also provided training for nurses. Later, a school begun for the children developed into a training college for disabled adults, Derwen College. The hospital was used once again to treat wounded soldiers during World War II. Following an extensive fire in 1948, the hospital underwent a period of reconstruction and expansion, developing into what is now called The Robert Jones and Agnes Hunt Orthopaedic Hospital.

Honours
She was created a Dame Commander of the Order of the British Empire (DBE) in 1926.

Death
Hunt died in 1948 aged eighty-one. Her ashes were interred in the parish churchyard at Baschurch, where there is also a plaque inside the church, which reads: "Reared in suffering thou shalt know how to solace others' woe. The reward of pain doth lie in the gift of sympathy."

References

Sources

External links
 Shropshire History
 OsCell is a dedicated website to The Robert Jones and Agnes Hunt Orthopaedic and District Hospital for the medical and science teams to provide information available for patients and current work
 Orthopeadic Institute is a charity that helps The Robert Jones and Agnes Hunt Orthopaedic and District Hospital in Oswestry and also runs medical courses and books for doctors
 The Robert Jones and Agnes Hunt Orthopaedic and District Hospital
 Shropshire Hospitals in World War II

1866 births
1948 deaths
Nurses from London
Members of the Royal Red Cross
Dames Commander of the Order of the British Empire
Jeremy Hunt
British nurses
British people with disabilities